The Green Park Metro Station is located on the Yellow Line of the Delhi Metro below Aurobindo Marg.

It serves Green Park Main, Yusuf Sarai Market and Green Park Extension. It is also a short walk from Aurobindo Place, located on the same road just south of the station. Places like Green Park Market, Gulmohar Park, Gautam Nagar have access from this metro station only. Restaurants like A2B, Evergreen and the famous National Institute of Fashion Technology can be reached by walk from this metro station

Station layout

Facilities
List of available ATM at Green Park metro station are HDFC Bank, SBI

Entry/exit

Connections

Bus
Delhi Transport Corporation bus routes number 502, 503, 505, 507CL, 516, 517, 519, 548CL, 605, serves the station from nearby Green Park bus stop.

See also

References

External links

 Delhi Metro Rail Corporation Ltd. (Official site) 
 Delhi Metro Annual Reports
 

Delhi Metro stations
Railway stations opened in 2010
Railway stations in South Delhi district
2010 establishments in Delhi